Leontopodium sinense is a species of plant in the family Asteraceae. It is native to China.

References

sinense
Plants described in 1888